Bat's Path End was a hamlet near Trinity, Newfoundland and Labrador, Canada. The nearest post office was in Shoal Harbour.

See also
 List of ghost towns in Newfoundland and Labrador

Ghost towns in Newfoundland and Labrador